Michael Alan Henneman (born December 11, 1961) is a former Major League Baseball pitcher with a 10-year career from 1987 to 1996. He played for the Detroit Tigers and Texas Rangers, both of the American League, and the Houston Astros of the National League.

Henneman was born in St. Charles, Missouri but adopted and raised by a family in Festus, Missouri. He graduated from St. Pius X High School in Festus, and attended Jefferson College in nearby Hillsboro in order to play college basketball but worked his way onto the college baseball team after impressing the school's coach in an American Legion baseball game. In 1983, he played collegiate summer baseball with the Wareham Gatemen of the Cape Cod Baseball League.

Henneman was named the Sporting News Rookie Pitcher of the Year in 1987, and led Tiger relief pitchers in wins and earned run average in both 1987 and 1988.  Henneman was elected to the American League All-Star team in 1989.

Henneman has the second most saves (154) in Tigers history, behind only Todd Jones.

Since retiring from baseball, Henneman has been a coach and roving instructor in the Tigers' minor league system.

Henneman was adopted as an infant and only found out about five brothers and two sisters after taking a DNA test in 2020.

See also
Best pitching seasons by a Detroit Tiger

References

External links
, or Retrosheet

1961 births
Living people
American League All-Stars
Baseball players from Missouri
Birmingham Barons players
Detroit Tigers players
Houston Astros players
Jefferson College (Missouri) alumni
Jefferson Vikings baseball players
Major League Baseball pitchers
Minor league baseball coaches
Nashville Sounds players
Oklahoma State Cowboys baseball players
Oklahoma State University alumni
People from St. Charles, Missouri
Texas Rangers players
Tiburones de La Guaira players
American expatriate baseball players in Venezuela
Toledo Mud Hens players
Wareham Gatemen players
Junior college men's basketball players in the United States
American adoptees